Nógrádsipek is a village in Nógrád County, Hungary with 697 inhabitants (2014).

Etymology
The name comes from the Slavic šípek—dog rose.

References

Populated places in Nógrád County